Prashanti Talpankar is a writer, translator, playwright and actor, hailing from the coastal state of Goa, India. She is also a recipient of the Sahitya Akademi Award for Translation. She currently serves as an associate professor at Dnyanprassark Mandal's college and Research Centre, Assagao.

Early life
Prashanti Talpankar grew up as a student leader and as a part of Goa's historic official language agitation.

Career

Writing 
Talpankar has been into writing since her college days. Her poems have previously featured on All India Radio, Panaji. She has also written few short stories. However, primarily she writes children's stories and translates literary works. She has written a book based on primary survey of migrant labour called Shadows in the Dark.

Books
In 2006, she published Shadows in the dark: The status of the migrant working community in Goa. In 2015, Talpankar released a Konkani translation of Shashi Deshpande's English book That Long Silence, titled as Dirgh Moun Te. This was awarded the Sahitya Akademi Award for Translation in 2017.

Filmography
Prashanti Talpankar has acted in many Konkani films. Some of her films include Aleesha (2004), Paltadacho Munis (2009), Baga Beach (2013) and Juze (2018). All of these films have won awards, at either the national or the international level.

Awards 
 Sahitya Akademi Prize for Translation, 2017

References

External links 
 
 

Living people
Writers from Goa
People from North Goa district
Actresses from Goa
Indian translators
Year of birth missing (living people)
Recipients of the Sahitya Akademi Prize for Translation